The S&H Green Stamp Classic was a golf tournament on the LPGA Tour from 1972 to 1974. It was played at the Memorial Golf Course in 1972 and the Westwood Country Club in Houston, Texas in 1973 and 1974.

Judy Rankin won the 1972 tournament on the first hole of a sudden-death playoff with Kathy Whitworth. To get in the playoff, Rankin eagled the 72nd hole. Then Rankin made eagle on the first playoff hole to get the victory.

Winners

S&H Green Stamp Classic
1974 Carol Mann
1973 Kathy Whitworth

Lady Eve Open
1972 Judy Rankin

References

External links
 Tournament results at GolfObserver.com

Former LPGA Tour events
Golf in Houston
Recurring sporting events established in 1972
Recurring sporting events disestablished in 1974
1972 establishments in Texas
1974 disestablishments in Texas
Women's sports in Texas